Eniyadi is a small village in Kuttikol Panchayath and near Bandaduka Town in the Kasaragod. Eniyadi Maqam is a religious place of Muslims.

Sports

Major sports are soccer, cricket and volleyball.

Holy Places
 Badar Juma Masjid
 Eniyadi Maqam
 Noorul Islam Madrassa

Clubs
 New Green Star arts and sports club

Other
 Dallas Car Wash
 Sree Sree tyres and tyre works
 Workshop

Nearby Places
 Thayal Eniyadi
 Bandaduka Town

Suburbs of Kasaragod